Viktor Viktorovich Voronkov (born 4 August 1974) is a former Russian professional footballer.

Club career
He made his debut in the Russian Premier League in 2000 for FC Dynamo Moscow.

Honours
 Latvian Higher League bronze: 1998, 1999.

References

1974 births
Footballers from Moscow
Living people
Russian footballers
Russian Premier League players
Russian expatriate footballers
Expatriate footballers in Latvia
FK Ventspils players
FC Dynamo Moscow players
FC Kuban Krasnodar players
FC Khimki players
FC Metallurg Lipetsk players
Russian expatriate sportspeople in Latvia
FC Volga Nizhny Novgorod players
FC Nizhny Novgorod (2007) players
Association football midfielders
FC Novokuznetsk players
FC MVD Rossii Moscow players
FC Spartak-MZhK Ryazan players
FC Amur Blagoveshchensk players